St Raphael's Church, Surbiton is the Roman Catholic parish church of Surbiton. It is dedicated to Saint Raphael and located on Portsmouth Road. It is Grade II* listed.

History
It was designed by the eminent architect Charles Parker in an Italianate style, with early Christian and Renaissance influences. The entire cost was met by Alexander Raphael, a Catholic Armenian whose family came from India.  He became the first Roman Catholic to be elected Sheriff of London after the passing of the Catholic Emancipation Act in 1829. Raphael built the Church in 1846 as a family chapel and named it after St Raphael. It was completed in 1848. But soon after, in November 1850, he died. His nephew, Edward, inherited the property and opened it to the public as the first Roman Catholic church in Kingston.

Through successive bequests, the Church and land became the property of Captain Hon. George Savile, brother to the Sixth Earl of Mexborough, a Yorkshire family. Lady Anne Savile, daughter of the fourth Earl, lived nearby in Thames Ditton and a plaque is to be seen inside the Church commemorating her death. Unlike many other members of the Savile family buried in the vault under the High Altar, she has no known grave.

The church was sold to the Diocese of Southwark after the Second World War and is now on the Registered List of Buildings of historical and architectural interest. The church was officially consecrated on St Raphael's Day (28 September) 2012.

References

External links

Roman Catholic churches in the Royal Borough of Kingston upon Thames
Grade II* listed buildings in the Royal Borough of Kingston upon Thames
Grade II* listed churches in London
Churches in the Diocese of Southwark
Saint Raphael
Roman Catholic churches completed in 1848
19th-century Roman Catholic church buildings in the United Kingdom
History of the Royal Borough of Kingston upon Thames
Churches on the Thames